Ivan Prezelj (29 August 1895 – 22 April 1973) was a Yugoslav military officer and commander of Blue Guard, a detachment of Yugoslav Army in the Fatherland in German-occupied Slovenia during the World War II.

Before the Second World War, Prezelj was the Yugoslav military attache in Prague.

Prezelj was initially subordinated to Major Karl Novak and Colonel Vladimir Vauhnik. After the defeat in the Battle of Grčarice, Major Novak resigned and Prezelj was appointed in his place by Draža Mihailović. Mihailović promoted Prezelj to the rank of General on 29 June or 1 December 1944. The headquarter of Prezelj was with Notranjska Detachment and Soča Detachments.

Prezelj in Ljubljana met with Dimitrije Ljotić and Momčilo Đujić in 1945. In April 1945 Prezelj was appointed as commander of Slovenian People's Army while Mirko Bitanc was appointed as his deputy.

After the World War II Prezelj escaped from communists to Italy.

References

Sources 

 
 
 
 
 
 
 

1895 births
1973 deaths
Chetnik personnel of World War II
Slovenian Chetnik personnel of World War II